Honeypot Wood is a  biological Site of Special Scientific Interest west of Dereham in Norfolk. It is managed by the Norfolk Wildlife Trust

This is an ancient coppiced wood on calcareous soil. It has a rich ground layer, which is dominated by dog's mercury, and other flora include greater butterfly-orchid and broad-leaved helleborine. A total of 208 plant species have been recorded.

There is public access to the site.

References

Norfolk Wildlife Trust
Sites of Special Scientific Interest in Norfolk